Bert and Ernie are two Muppet characters who appear together in numerous skits on the long-running PBS/HBO children's television show, Sesame Street. Originated by Frank Oz and Jim Henson, the characters are currently performed by puppeteers Eric Jacobson and Peter Linz; Oz performed Bert until 2006.

History
Bert and Ernie were built by Don Sahlin from a simple design scribbled by Jim Henson, creator of The Muppets. Initially, Henson performed Bert and Oz performed Ernie, but after just one day of rehearsal, they switched characters. The original idea was to show that even though two people can have totally different characteristics, they can still be good friends.

According to writer Jon Stone, the relationship between Bert and Ernie reflected the real life friendship between Oz and Henson. Although their names are commonly believed to have been drawn from those of two minor characters in the Frank Capra film It's A Wonderful Life, sources from within the Sesame Street production team suggest that the identical names were coincidental.  

According to A&E's Biography, Bert and Ernie were virtually the only Muppets to appear in the Sesame Street pilot episode, which was screen-tested to a number of families in July 1969. Their brief appearance was the only part of the pilot that tested well, so it was decided that not only should Muppet characters be the "stars" of the show, but would also interact with the human characters, something that was not done in the pilot.

An ordinary Bert and Ernie sketch involves Ernie coming up with a harebrained idea, and Bert trying to talk him out of it, usually getting him frustrated and Ernie dumbfounded. For example, if Ernie wanted to do something loud if Bert is doing something quiet like reading a book or the newspaper, Bert would teach him how to be quiet; however, Ernie would still make some noise, which would cause Bert to either lose his temper or leave the room.

Sesame Street Live performer Taylor Morgan said in an interview that "I just kind of try to think like a six year old or a seven year old, because that's how old Bert is."

Bert

Bert was initially performed by Frank Oz. Since 1997, Muppeteer Eric Jacobson has been phased in as Bert's primary performer after Oz retired from most of his Muppet duties to focus on directing. Bert is a “hand rod puppet", which means that while the puppeteer's right arm is inserted into Bert's head to control the mouth, the puppeteer's left hand uses rods to control the arms of the puppet. Bert has one large eyebrow, known as a unibrow.

Ernie

Ernie was originally performed by Jim Henson until his death in 1990. From 1993 to 2014, Muppeteer Steve Whitmire took on the role of Ernie. From 2014 to 2017, Billy Barkhurst took on the role of Ernie; currently, the character is performed by Peter Linz.

Ernie is a "live hand puppet", meaning that while operating the head of the puppet with his right hand, the puppeteer inserts his left hand into a T shaped sleeve, capped off with a glove that matches the fabric "skin" of the puppet, thus "becoming" the left arm of the puppet. A second puppeteer usually provides the right arm.

Ernie's performance of "Rubber Duckie," wherein he sings affectionately about his squeaking toy duck and the joy it brings him during bath time, became a modest mainstream hit, reaching No. 16 on the Billboard Hot 100 in September 1970.

In popular culture

Bert and Ernie are among a handful of Sesame Street-specific Muppets to also appear on The Muppet Show, making occasional cameo appearances, such as at the end of The Muppets Valentine Show, the pilot episode of 1974 for the series. While several other Muppets featured on Sesame Street such as Kermit the Frog would cross over into the other program, Bert and Ernie were primarily confined to the occasional cameo.

Sexual orientation discussion
Bert and Ernie live together in an apartment located in the basement of 123 Sesame Street. Despite sleeping in separate beds, they share the same bedroom, which has led to some speculation that they are a representation of a gay couple.

This has repeatedly been denied by Sesame Workshop, and some of Bert's interactions with female characters do appear to show that he is attracted to women, like serenading Connie Stevens in the Some Enchanted Evening segment of a first-season episode of The Muppet Show, and recording a song about his girlfriend, "I Want to Hold Your Ear", which was released on several albums.

In July 2013, The New Yorker magazine chose an image of Bert and Ernie by artist Jack Hunter, titled Moment of Joy, as the cover of their publication, which covers the Supreme Court decisions on the Defense of Marriage Act and California's . Sesame Workshop was reportedly so outraged by the idea that it was rumored to be considering the possibility of litigation.

In September 2018, Mark Saltzman, one of the script and songwriters for Sesame Street, alleged in an interview with Queerty that Bert and Ernie were analogues for his own intimate relationship with film editor Arnold Glassman, although he did not begin writing for Sesame Street until fifteen years after Bert's and Ernie's first appearance.

Sesame Workshop responded by asserting that Bert and Ernie have no sexual orientations, because they are puppets. Frank Oz, who previously performed as Bert, stated Bert and Ernie were not gay, saying,
 "They're not, of course, a gay couple. But why that question? Does it really matter? Why the need to define people as only gay? There's much more to a human being than just straightness or gayness."

Sesame Street went on to clarify further, stating:
 "No, Bert and Ernie aren't gay — they're 'best friends'".
The Gaystar News reported that fans reacted negatively to this assertion. Frank Oz later tweeted in September 2018,
 "A last thought: If Jim and I had created Bert and Ernie as gay characters they would be inauthentic, coming from two straight men. However, I have now learned that many view them as representative of a loving gay relationship. And that's pretty wonderful. Thanks for helping me understand."

Parody and other uses
From March 30, 1997, to ca. 2002, the parody website "Bert is Evil" displayed Bert in a number of doctored photographs, implicating him in crimes ranging from the Assassination of John F. Kennedy to those of Jack the Ripper. A similar image from another source and featuring Bert conferring with Osama bin Laden was mistakenly included by a Bangladeshi print shop on a series of protest signs in October 2001 and 2002.

The German comedy sketch series, Freitag Nacht News had a recurring sketch called Bernie und Ert created by Attik Kargar, who performed the puppets and supplied the voice of Bernie. Bernie and Ert are a parody of Ernie and Bert, and especially redubbed on Sesamstrasse. The puppets had no nose, one eye each, and swapped hairstyles. Depicting them as a dysfunctional gay couple of petty criminals (Bernie being a promiscuous bisexual), each sketch focused on typically adult themes such as crime, drug abuse, masturbation, and Friday the 13th. In February 2003, Bernie and Ert were dropped from the series because of legal concerns; however, older episodes circulate on the internet.

Bernie and Ert also appeared in a Freitag Nacht News sequence called Bullzeye in a sketch called "Popo Club". Bernie and Ert both wore black masks and leather jackets, disguised as Unknown No. 1 and Unknown No. 2 respectively, with another character named Winfred, propagating bizarre sexual practices. This skit became popular that it resulted in more skits called "Popo Club" featuring Unknowns No. 1 and 2, with occasional appearances by Winfred.

The musical Avenue Q, an adult-oriented parody of Sesame Street, features a pair of characters named Rod (performed by John Tartaglia) and Nicky (performed by Rick Lyon), who are parodies of Bert and Ernie, respectively. Rod is a conservative investment banker and closeted homosexual, while Nicky is his slacker roommate who suspects that Rod may be gay.

The film It's a Wonderful Life (1946) includes a taxi driver named Ernie and a policeman named Bert. Jerry Juhl, a writer on many Henson projects, said that the film did not influence the creation of these two Muppets: "Despite his many talents, Jim had no memory for details like this. He knew the movie, of course, but would not have remembered the cop and the cabdriver."

The special by Sesame Street, Elmo Saves Christmas, refers to the coincidence: in the special, It's a Wonderful Life plays on television continuously and, near the end, the Muppets Bert and Ernie walk by the television set and stop short when they hear their names mentioned in the movie.

In the pilot episode of Eerie, Indiana, which aired in 1991, Marshal and Simon are subtly asked for help by a pair of twin brothers named Bertram and Ernest (called Bert and Ernie for short), because their mother has forced them to sleep every night in her Forever Ware containers, thus having kept them at age twelve for over thirty years. This could allude to the fact Bert and Ernie have not aged in all the years that Sesame Street has aired.

In April 2013, a pair of high energy neutrinos detected at the IceCube Neutrino Observatory, possibly of extragalactic origin, were nicknamed "Bert" and "Ernie". The British soap opera EastEnders has confirmed that characters Bert and Ernie Moon are named after the Muppets.

Internationally
 Arab World, Iftah Ya Simsim, Bert is "Badr", and Ernie is "Anis". They are called "Anis w Badr"
 Brazil, Vila Sésamo, Bert is "Beto", and Ernie is "Ênio". They're called "Ênio e Beto".
 Catalonia, Barri Sèsam, in the Catalan-language version,  they are "Epi i Blai".
 Egypt, Alam Simsim, Bert is "Hadi", and Ernie is Shadi. They are known as "Shadi w Hadi".
 France, 1, Rue Sésame, Bert is "Bart" and Ernie is "Ernest". They are called "Ernest et Bart". In the French version, when Bert's brother Bart comes to visit, he is called "Bert".
 Germany, Sesamstraße, they are called "Ernie und Bert".
 India, Galli Galli Sim Sim, they are called Bert aur Ernie.
 Israel, Rechov Sumsum, Bert is "Bentz", a common short-form for the name "Ben-Tzion", and Ernie is "Arik", short-form for "Arie".
 Italy, Sesamo apriti, Bert is "Berto" and Ernie is "Ernesto". They are called "Ernesto e Berto".
 Mexico and all Latin America, Plaza Sésamo, Bert is "Beto", while Ernie is "Enrique". In addition, Ernie's cousin Ernestine is called "Enriqueta".
 Netherlands, Sesamstraat they are "Bert en Ernie". Paul Haenen provides Bert's voice, and Wim T. Schippers provides Ernie's.
 Norway, Sesam Stasjon, Bert is "Bernt", while Ernie is "Erling". Usually, they're called "Bernt og Erling", respectively voiced by Harald Mæle and Magnus Nielsen.
 Pakistan, Khul Ja Sim Sim, Bert is "Bablu", while Ernie is "Annu". They are commonly called "Annu aur Bablu".
 Poland, Ulica Sezamkowa, Bert is "Hubert" and Ernie is "Emil". They are called "Hubert i Emil".
 Portugal, Rua Sésamo, Bert is "Becas" and Ernie is "Egas". They are called "Egas e Becas", in the opposite order.
 Russia, Ulitsa Sezam, Bert is Vlas and Ernie is Yenik. They are called Vlas i Yenik ("Влас и Еник")
 Spain, Barrio Sésamo, Bert is "Blas", and Ernie is "Epi". Also, they are always called "Epi y Blas", in the opposite order. 
 Turkey, Susam Sokağı, Bert is "Büdü", while Ernie is "Edi". They are commonly called "Edi ile Büdü".

See also
 Bert and Ernie's Great Adventures

References

External links
 Sesame Street at PBS Kids
 Sesame Workshop
 Tough Pigs Anthology Transcripts of Bert and Ernie sketches

American comedy duos
Fictional characters from New York City
Fictional duos
Television characters introduced in 1969
Television duos
Sesame Street Muppet characters
Sesame Street segments

de:Sesamstraße#Ernie und Bert